Bucephalus may refer to:
 Bucephalus (brand), an ox-head branding mark anciently used on horses
 Bucephalus (c. 355 BC – 326 BC), Alexander the Great's horse
 Bucephalus (racehorse), an 18th-century Thoroughbred racehorse
 Bucephalus (trematode), a trematode flatworm genus
 Bucephalus Bouncing Ball (song), a song from the 1997 album "Come To Daddy" by Aphex Twin
 HMS Bucephalus, an early 19th-century English naval vessel  see also Invasion of Java (1811).
 The Crystal Bucephalus, an original 1994 Doctor Who novel written by Craig Hinton
 BTR-4 "Bucephalus", Ukrainian armored troop carrier

See also
 Bucephala (disambiguation)